Alexander Viets Griswold (April 22, 1766 – February 15, 1843) was the 5th Presiding Bishop of the Episcopal Church in the United States from 1836 until 1843. He was also the Bishop of the Eastern Diocese, which included all of New England with the exception of the Episcopal Diocese of Connecticut. Griswold was an evangelical Episcopalian.

Biography
Born in Simsbury, Connecticut, Alexander Viets Griswold was the son of Elisha Griswold and Eunice Viets. Griswold died in Boston, Massachusetts. He married Elizabeth Mitchelson on 6 May 1785 or 1786 at Scotland (now Bloomfield), Connecticut. They had 12 children. His sister was the painter Eunice Pinney.

Griswold received the degree of D.D. from Brown in 1810, from Princeton in 1811, and from Harvard in 1812.

Griswold was ordained deacon on June 7, 1795, and priest on October 1, 1795. Griswold served three small churches in Litchfield County and also taught school. Griswold was chosen rector of St. Michael's Church, Bristol, Rhode Island, in 1804. He was elected bishop and consecrated on May 29, 1811. As the eldest serving bishop, he also served as the Episcopal Church's fifth Presiding Bishop from July 17, 1836, until his death.

Griswold also served as Chancellor of Brown University from 1815 to 1828. He was a cousin of both Frank Griswold and Sheldon M. Griswold, both Episcopal bishops.

Works
Griswold wrote the hymn Holy Father, great Creator.  He also published Discourses on the Most Important Doctrines and Duties of the Christian Religion (1830); The Reformation and the Apostolic Office (1843); and Remarks on Social Prayer Meetings (1858). His memoirs were published by Dr. J. S. Stone.  Some of his papers and a lock of his hair are stored in the University Library, University of Rhode Island.

Honors
The former Griswold College in Davenport, Iowa, was named in honor of Griswold.

See also

 List of presiding bishops of the Episcopal Church in the United States of America
 List of Episcopal bishops of the United States
 Historical list of the Episcopal bishops of the United States

References

Further reading

External links
 Documents by Alexander Viets Griswold from Project Canterbury
  Memoior of the Life of Alexander Viets Griswold at Internet Archive

1766 births
1843 deaths
Harvard University alumni
Brown University alumni
Princeton University alumni
Presiding Bishops of the Episcopal Church in the United States of America
Episcopal bishops of Massachusetts
19th-century Anglican bishops in the United States
Chancellors of Brown University
Evangelical Anglican bishops
Burials at Old Village Cemetery
People from Simsbury, Connecticut
Episcopal bishops of Rhode Island
18th-century Anglican theologians
19th-century Anglican theologians